The 2018–19 Louisiana Tech Bulldogs basketball team represented Louisiana Tech University during the 2018–19 NCAA Division I men's basketball season. The Bulldogs, led by fourth-year head coach Eric Konkol, played their home games at the Thomas Assembly Center in Ruston, Louisiana as members of Conference USA.

Previous season 
The Bulldogs finished the 2017–18 season 17–16, 7–11 in C-USA play to finish in a tie for ninth place. As the No. 10 seed in the C-USA tournament, they defeated North Texas before losing to Old Dominion in the quarterfinals.

Offseason

Departures

Incoming Transfers

Recruiting class of 2018

Roster

Schedule and results

|-
!colspan=12 style=|Exhibition

|-
!colspan=12 style=|Non-conference regular season

|-
!colspan=12 style=| Conference USA regular season

|-
!colspan=12 style=| Conference USA tournament

Source

References

Louisiana Tech Bulldogs basketball seasons
Louisiana Tech
Louisiana Tech Bulldogs men's b
Louisiana Tech Bulldogs men's b